George Washington West (1851–1926) was a Texas rancher. He was one of the first cattlemen to drive longhorns to the Kansas railhead. He was reported to have commanded one of the longest recorded cattle drives, which started at Lavaca County and ended at the Canadian border. He founded the towns of George West, Texas, and Kittie, Texas. both in Live Oak County.

Early life 
West was born in Shannonville, Tennessee, to the parents of Washington West  and Mary Buckwalter Willauer. In 1854 West moved his family to Lavaca County. Their home became a main stop for  stagecoaches that later would help create the community of Sweet Home. He married Catherine Elizabeth "Kittie" Searcy on 8 Jun 1874.

Career 
West was one of the first to drive longhorn cattle to the Kansas railheads from 1867 until the trails closed. In 1870 he agreed to contract out with the government to deliver 14,000 head of longhorns to the Rosebud Indian Reservation in Montana. The journey started at Lavaca County, Texas and ended  100 miles just south of the Canadian boarder. West made many drives to Kansas, Nebraska, Montana, Wyoming and the Dakotas. In 1880 with his wife Kittie, West moved to Live Oak County and purchased 140,000-acre of land and 26,000 cattle. The ranch included the present site of George West, Texas. In 1882 West had about 80,000 but many died due to droughts in the region, Because of the droughts West had to sell 60,000 acres to Charles Simmons, who subdivided it, held a lottery for lots, and established the town of Simmons, Texas, in 1907.

Later life 
In 1912 West turned his efforts towards development by donating $100,000 and a legal right, through his ranch to San Antonio, to Uvalde and Gulf Railroad. In 1913 West founded the town of George West. He built a $75,000 courthouse. West spent $50,000 building schools, highways, bridges, public utilities, and a hotel across from the railroad depot. In 1904 George moved to San Antonio, Texas, where he died on February 16, 1926, at age 74.

References 

Ranchers from Texas
1851 births
1926 deaths